Feels Like Breakin' Shit, or Self...Feels Like Breakin' Shit, is the third studio album by alternative pop/rock band Self, which was released for free via the internet.

Its 17 previously unreleased tracks include covers of Prince's "Let's Pretend We're Married", Suzanne Vega's "Fat Man and Dancing Girl", and Tommy Roe's "Dizzy". "Moronic" parodies Alanis Morissette's "Ironic," and the Pixies' "Gigantic" is parodied by Self's "Titanic".

The album was composed of leftover songs from Self's previous two albums, Subliminal Plastic Motives and The Half-Baked Serenade, and was originally given to friends and family members of the band. Matt has said in interviews that he made many of these songs as a joke and never intended to release them, but when a record executive heard the songs he deemed it worthy of an internet release. There were several versions of the album, one released on Spongebath's website and one on DreamWorks's website. The DreamWorks version featured "Overpopulation" as the 9th track, with "Moronic" appearing on the Spongebath version. Fans were encouraged to make their own artwork for the album, and as such there are many different versions of the front cover.

Track listing

"Overpopulation" (2:15) appears on the DreamWorks version of the album in place of "Moronic"

1997 albums
Self (band) albums
Albums free for download by copyright owner
DreamWorks Records albums